Burning Mountain, the common name for Mount Wingen, is a hill near Wingen, New South Wales, Australia, approximately  north of Sydney just off the New England Highway. It takes its name from a smouldering coal seam running underground through the sandstone. Burning Mountain is contained within the Burning Mountain Nature Reserve, which is administered by the NSW National Parks and Wildlife Service (NPWS).

A trail with information panels runs from the parking lots to the site where smoke emanates from the ground.

The Leyland brothers reported on Mount Wingen in the first episode of their travel programme, Ask The Leyland Brothers:

Coal seam fire
It is estimated that the fire has burned for approximately 6,000 years and is the oldest known coal fire.

European explorers and settlers to the area believed the smoke, coming from the ground, was volcanic in origin. It was not until 1829 that geologist Reverend C. P. N. Wilton identified it as a coal seam fire.

The combustion has caused soil discolouration and an uneven ground surface in the area.

See also

 Brennender Berg
 Centralia, Pennsylvania
 Darvaza gas crater
 Eternal flame
 List of coal mine fires
 List of mountains in New South Wales
 New Straitsville mine fire
 Smoking Hills
 Yanar Dag

References

Upper Hunter Shire
Mountains of New South Wales
Geology of New South Wales
Persistent natural fires